France competed at the 2022 Winter Paralympics in Beijing, China which took place between 4–13 March 2022. In total, 15 athletes competed in four sports.

Medalists

The following French competitors won medals at the games. In the discipline sections below, the medalists' names are bolded.

| width="56%" align="left" valign="top" |

| width="22%" align="left" valign="top" |

Administration

The flagbearers of France at ceremonies of the 2022 Winter Paralympics were selected by athletes and not by the French Paralympic and Sports Committee (CPSF).

Competitors
The following is the list of number of competitors participating at the Games per sport/discipline.

Alpine skiing

Marie Bochet is among the alpine skiers.

Men

Women

Biathlon

Two competitors competed in biathlon.

Men

Cross-country skiing

France competed in cross-country skiing.

Men

Relay

Snowboarding

Maxime Montaggioni and Mathias Menendez were among the snowboarders for France.

Banked slalom

Snowboard cross

See also
France at the Paralympics
France at the 2022 Winter Olympics

References

Nations at the 2022 Winter Paralympics
2022
Winter Paralympics